Çelu is the third extended play (EP) by Albanian singer and songwriter Elvana Gjata released on 16 April 2021 by Loudcom Media under exclusive license from East Music Matters (EMM).

Background and composition 

Distributed by Loudcom Media under exclusive license from East Music Matters (EMM), "Çelu" was announced to be released on 16 April 2021 preceded by the extended play's title and its cover on Gjata's official social media two day prior to release. Containing songs written in the Albanian language, the composing, writing and producing process for the record was predominantly handled by Gjata herself along Albanian composer Pirro Çako and Macedonian producer Darko Dimitrov. Albanian producer Andi Islami provided additional mastering and mixing production for the record. Çako and Dimitrov had previously collaborated with the singer on numerous songs and albums, including on her second extended play, 3, in 2018.

Release and promotion 

Loudcom Media under exclusive license from East Music Matters (EMM) made "Çelu" available for digital download and streaming in various countries on 16 April 2021. The cover artwork for "Çelu" was shot by Albanian photographer Endrit Mërtiri and portrays a close-up image of Gjata's face in front of a turbulent background while wearing a white jumpsuit designed by American designer Sara Wong. Three songs succeeded "Çelu" in April 2021 to commercial success in Albania. "Drandofilat" peaked at number one in her native country, while both "Kunadhe" and "Mos u ngut" also reached the top 10 at number 4 and 9, respectively. Six music videos, one for each of the song on the extended play except for "Vendi im", were released simultaneously with the release on 16 April at 19:00 (CET). The visuals were directed by Blendi Kalivaçi and edited by Sami Leka, while production was handled by Max Production. Each of the video occurs in the same location but have independent storylines, with Gjata embodying different female characters as well as adopting different looks.

Personnel 

Credits adapted from Tidal and YouTube.

Elvana Gjatasongwriting, vocals
Andi Islamimastering, mixing
Darko Dimitrovmastering, mixing, producing
Gent Rushiinstrumentalist
Pirro Çakocomposing
Shkëlqim Duleinstrumentalist

Track listing

Release history

References 

2021 EPs
Elvana Gjata albums
Albanian-language albums